Arnold Hamer (8 December 1916 – 3 November 1993) was a first-class cricketer, who played for Yorkshire in 1938, and for Derbyshire between 1950 and 1960, scoring over 15,000 runs in first-class cricket. He also played as a footballer, playing eight games for York City in 1938.

Early career
Hamer was born in Huddersfield, Yorkshire. He began playing cricket at Yorkshire in 1937 in the second eleven. He played two first-class matches for Yorkshire in 1938 making three runs in total, and taking one wicket for 64 runs. He also played football for York City in 1938, where he made eight appearances as a left back.

During World War II Hamer played occasional cricket games for Yorkshire teams.

Derbyshire career
Hamer began his career with Derbyshire in the 1950 season when his top score was 80 and his average 28.58. He also took 15 wickets and achieved his best bowling performance of 4 for 27. In the 1951 season he scored his first century against Middlesex and took fifteen wickets again. In the 1952 season he scored a century in both matches against Nottinghamshire and one against Middlesex. He was top scorer for the club in the 1953 season when he made centuries against Yorkshire and Nottinghamshire. He also took 17 wickets. In the 1954 season he was top scorer again and scored centuries against Essex, Sussex and Yorkshire. He took ten wickets. He was top scorer for the club again in the 1955 season, and made centuries against Glamorgan and Nottinghamshire when he made his top score of 227. In the 1956 season he scored centuries against Glamorgan, Somerset and Nottinghamshire. He was top score for the club again in the 1957 season and made centuries against Sussex, Lancashire, Worcestershire and Surrey. He scored no centuries in the 1958 season, and scored one against Sussex in the 1959 season. He closed his first-class cricket career in the 1960 season.

Hamer was a right-handed opening batsman and made 15,465 runs at 31.17 in 295 first-class matches. He had a highest score of 227, and made 19 centuries. Hamer scored 1,000 runs in 10 consecutive seasons. He was also an off-break bowler, and took 71 first-class wickets at an average of 33.28.

Hamer died in Huddersfield in November 1993, at the age of 76.

See also
List of English cricket and football players

References

External links
 

1916 births
Cricketers from Huddersfield
1993 deaths
English cricketers
Derbyshire cricketers
English footballers
Association football fullbacks
York City F.C. players
Yorkshire cricketers
Players cricketers
English cricketers of 1919 to 1945
English cricketers of 1946 to 1968